The Oakwood–Chimborazo Historic District is a national historic district of  located in Richmond, Virginia.  It includes 1,284 contributing buildings, three contributing structures, five contributing objects and four contributing sites. It includes work by architect D. Wiley Anderson. The predominantly residential area contains a significant collection of late-19th and early-20th century, brick and frame dwellings that display an eclectic mixture of Late Victorian, Queen Anne, and Colonial Revival styles.

It was listed on the Virginia Landmarks Register on September 8, 2004, and the National Register of Historic Places on March 18, 2005.

References

Historic districts on the National Register of Historic Places in Virginia
National Register of Historic Places in Richmond, Virginia
Victorian architecture in Virginia
Queen Anne architecture in Virginia
Colonial Revival architecture in Virginia
Neighborhoods in Richmond, Virginia